P. V. Narasimha Rao was sworn in as Prime Minister of India on 21 June 1991.

Cabinet

              

|}

Ministers of state
 Ram Lal Rahi, Ministry of Home Affairs
 Suresh Pachouri, Ministry of Defence 1995-1996
 Salman Khurshid, Ministry of External Affairs
 Mamata Banerjee, Ministry of Human Resource Development, Ministry of Youth Affairs and Sports and Ministry Women and Child Development
 Suresh Kalmadi, Ministry of Railways
 Dr. Mallikarajun, Ministry of Railways
 Kahnu Charan Lenka, Ministry of Railways
 P. J. Kurien, Ministry of industry 1991–93.
 Basavarajeshwari, Minister of State for Women and Child Development

References

Indian union ministries
1991 establishments in India
Rao administration
1996 disestablishments in India
Cabinets established in 1991
Cabinets disestablished in 1996